Kim Min-ho may refer to:

Kim Min-ho (footballer, born 1985), South Korean former footballer
Kim Min-ho (footballer, born 1990), South Korean former footballer; spent 4 years with Incheon National University's team
Kim Min-ho (footballer, born 1991), South Korean former footballer
Kim Min-ho (footballer, born 1997), South Korean footballer, currently playing for Ansan Greeners
Kim Min-ho (footballer, born 2000), South Korean footballer, currently playing for Nagano Parceiro
 (born 1969), South Korean baseball player, winner of the 1995 Korean Series Most Valuable Player Award
 (born 1990), South Korean actor, nominated for various awards for his role in Swing Kids